Bokermannohyla nanuzae is a species of frog in the family Hylidae. It is endemic to Brazil and known from the Serra do Espinhaço and Serra da Mantiqueira in the Minas Gerais state.

Etymology
The specific name nanuzae honours , one of Brazil's most important botanists.

Habitat and conservation
It is threatened by habitat loss caused by mining, fires, and infrastructure development for human settlement. Also disturbance by tourists is a threat. It occurs in the Serra do Cipó National Park.

References

nanuzae
Endemic fauna of Brazil
Amphibians of Brazil
Amphibians described in 1973
Taxonomy articles created by Polbot